"Joe Soap" is British rhyming slang denoting a foolish stooge or scapegoat, Joe being an ordinary person, with Soap as a rhyme for dope.

History

The phrase appeared in a 1943 book of military slang by John Hunt and Alan Pringle: "Joe Soap, the 'dumb' or not so intelligent members of the forces. The men who are 'over-willing' and therefore the usual 'stooges'." The name Joe Soap appears in the WW1 song "Joe Soap's Army", sung to the tune of "Onward, Christian Soldiers". ("Forward, Joe Soap's army, marching without fear, with our brave commander, safely in the rear.")

In popular culture

The song "Blind Youth" by "The Human League", released in 1979, contains the refrain: Blind youth, take hope/You're no Joe Soap/Your time is due/Big fun come soon!

Joe Soap was a photographic comic series published in the British comic book Eagle, from number 12 (dated 12 June 1982) until number 45 (dated 29 January 1983). It was written by Alan Grant and John Wagner, with photography by Gary Compton. Another character of the same name appeared in Cracker and The Beezer. The humorous strip featured Joseph Soaper, a self-styled hardboiled "enquiry agent", who was in reality a down-trodden and occasionally incompetent private detective. Nicknamed Soap for his softness, Soaper spent his days mired in unprofitable or even ludicrous cases, which weren't helped by his tendency to miss obvious clues and antagonise both clients and police. The character of Joe Soap would reappear during the late 1980s, this time in drawn form, in a comic strip/puzzle feature which would be published in both the Eagle Summer Special and the Eagle Annual of that year. Titled Could You Be a Joe Soap?, it encouraged readers to read the story carefully and try to spot in both the frames and speech balloons all the clues Joe missed. In the final panel, after realising that he has got everything completely wrong, Joe would almost always end up exclaiming, "Oh no! Where did I go wrong this time?", or words to that effect.

In 1994 Andrew Motion published a long poem with the title Joe Soap.

In the 2012 Dredd movie, a Joe Soap poster can be seen on a billboard during a bike chase scene.

'Joe Soap' was mentioned in chapter 17, page 125, of The Papers of Tony Veitch, the second book of William McIlvanney's Inspector Laidlaw trilogy: "One of those studio mock-up LPs of recent hits recorded by Joe Soap & Company was playing, authentic as a wooden penny. It belonged. Harkness wondered if that was why she wore her hair long: her ears were made of tin."

References

Eagle (comic) characters
Eagle comic strips
Humor comics
1982 comics debuts
1983 comics endings
Fictional private investigators